The following elections occurred in the year 1956.

Africa
 1956 Gold Coast legislative election
 1956 Italian Somaliland parliamentary election
 1956–1957 Kenyan legislative election
 1956 Nyasaland general election

Asia
 1956 Burmese general election
 1956 Ceylonese parliamentary election
 1956 Iranian legislative election
 1956 Japanese House of Councillors election

Australia
 1956 New South Wales state election
 1956 Queensland state election
 1956 South Australian state election
 1956 Tasmanian state election
 1956 Wentworth by-election
 1956 Western Australian state election

Europe
 1956 Dutch general election
 1956 Gibraltar general election
 1956 Greek legislative election
 1956 Icelandic parliamentary election
 1956 Maltese integration into the United Kingdom referendum
 1956 Swedish general election

Austria
 1956 Austrian legislative election

France
 1956 French legislative election

United Kingdom
 1956 Blaydon by-election
 1956 Chester-le-Street by-election
 1956 Leeds North East by-election
 1956 Mid Ulster by-election
 1956 Newport by-election

United Kingdom local

English local
 1956 Bermondsey Borough election
 1956 Southwark Borough election

North America
 1956 Honduran Constituent Assembly election
 1956 Panamanian general election
 1956 Salvadoran legislative election
 1956 Salvadoran presidential election

Canada
 1956 British Columbia general election
 1956 Edmonton municipal election
 1956 New Brunswick general election
 1956 Newfoundland general election
 1956 Nova Scotia general election
 1956 Ottawa municipal election
 1956 Quebec general election
 1956 Saskatchewan general election
 1956 Toronto municipal election

Caribbean
 1956 Antigua and Barbuda general election
 1956 Trinidad and Tobago general election

United States
 1956 United States elections
 1958 Alabama gubernatorial election
 United States House of Representatives elections in California, 1956
 1956 Louisiana gubernatorial election
 1956 Maine gubernatorial election
 1956 Massachusetts gubernatorial election
 1956 Minnesota gubernatorial election
 1956 New York state election
 United States House of Representatives elections in South Carolina, 1956
 1956 United States House of Representatives elections
 1956 United States Senate elections

United States Senate
 1956 United States Senate elections
 United States Senate election in Oregon, 1956
 United States Senate special election in South Carolina, 1956
 United States Senate election in South Carolina, 1956
 United States Senate election in North Dakota, 1956

Oceania

Australia
 1956 New South Wales state election
 1956 Queensland state election
 1956 South Australian state election
 1956 Tasmanian state election
 1956 Wentworth by-election
 1956 Western Australian state election

South America

Falkland Islands
 1956 Falkland Islands general election

See also

 
1956
Elections